"Is It Any Wonder?" is a popular song, written by Robert J. Hayes, Leroy W. Rodde, and Archie Gottler.

It was recorded by Joni James in 1953. The recording was released by MGM Records as catalog number 11470. The song was only on the Billboard magazine charts for 1 week; it reached #20 on May 2, 1953. The flip side was "Almost Always".

Semprini with Rhythm accompaniment recorded it in London on October 13, 1953 as the second song of the medley "Dancing to the piano (No. 22) - Hit medley of Fox Trots" along with "Bridge of Sighs" and "Look at That Girl". The medley was released by EMI on the His Master's Voice label as catalog number B 10592.

References

1953 singles
Songs written by Archie Gottler